Blunted on Reality is the debut studio album released by the American hip-hop group Fugees. The album was released in February 1994 through the Ruffhouse Records label. Three singles were released from the album, including ”Boof Baf”, ”Nappy Heads” and ”Vocab”.

Blunted on Reality received generally favorable reviews from music critics. In the United Kingdom the album has been certified silver by the British Phonographic Industry. It was followed up with the critically acclaimed second and final album, The Score in 1996.

Background
Blunted on Reality was written and subsequently recorded by the group in 1992. However, following a long dispute with their record label, the album was not released until February 1, 1994.

Most versions of the album contain eighteen tracks, with the addition of a remix of "Nappy Heads". Prior to the release of the album, "Boof Baf" was released as the album's lead single. Commercially, the single was unsuccessful, The album's highest-charting single is "Nappy Heads", which peaked at number 49 on the Billboard Hot 100. "Vocab" was released as the album's third and final single. However, the song was not successful on the Billboard Hot 100 chart.

The album was recorded at the House of Music Studios in West Orange, New Jersey. The Fugees have subsequently said that they allowed the producers to have too much control over the album's content and form.

Themes
While Blunted on Reality does not contain nearly as many overtly political lyrics as The Score, the album is still political. Wyclef Jean described the meaning of the title of the album in a 1994 interview on the topical talk show program, Lorna's Corner: 
“When the cop is messing around with somebody for something that the person didn’t do and they try to set ‘em up, that makes me blunted on reality. When the government is taking money on arms…and that money could be going back to the community it makes me blunted on reality. It’s just awareness of what’s going on…that’s what blunted on reality means…It don’t mean that I smoke weed…cause I’m too paranoid as it is.”

Reception
Before the release of their critically acclaimed sophomore album, The Score in 1996, the album sold an estimated 12,000 copies. Since then, the album has sold roughly 130,000 copies in the United States.

Track listing

Charts

Weekly charts

Singles

Certifications

Notes
A  "Vocab" did not enter the Billboard Hot 100, but peaked at number 8 on the Bubbling Under Hot 100 Singles chart, which acts as an extension to the Hot 100.

References

Further reading

1994 debut albums
Fugees albums
Columbia Records albums
Albums produced by Salaam Remi
Albums produced by Wyclef Jean